In thermodynamics, the triple point of a substance is the temperature and pressure at which the three phases (gas, liquid, and solid) of that substance coexist in thermodynamic equilibrium. It is that temperature and pressure at which the sublimation, fusion, and vaporisation curves meet.

In addition to the triple point for solid, liquid, and gas phases, a triple point may involve more than one solid phase, for substances with multiple polymorphs. Helium-4 is a special case that presents a triple point involving two different fluid phases (lambda point).

The triple point of water was used to define the kelvin, the base unit of thermodynamic temperature in the International System of Units (SI). The value of the triple point of water was fixed by definition, rather than by measurement, but that changed with the 2019 redefinition of SI base units. The triple points of several substances are used to define points in the ITS-90 international temperature scale, ranging from the triple point of hydrogen (13.8033 K) to the triple point of water (273.16 K, 0.01 °C, or 32.018 °F).

The term "triple point" was coined in 1873 by James Thomson, brother of Lord Kelvin.

Triple point of water

Gas–liquid–solid triple point

At that point, it is possible to change all of the substance to ice, water, or vapor by making arbitrarily small changes in pressure and temperature. Even if the total pressure of a system is well above the triple point of water, provided that the partial pressure of the water vapor is 611.657 pascals, then the system can still be brought to the triple point of water. Strictly speaking, the surfaces separating the different phases should also be perfectly flat, to negate the effects of surface tension.

The gas–liquid–solid triple point of water corresponds to the minimum pressure at which liquid water can exist. At pressures below the triple point (as in outer space), solid ice when heated at constant pressure is converted directly into water vapor in a process known as sublimation. Above the triple point, solid ice when heated at constant pressure first melts to form liquid water, and then evaporates or boils to form vapor at a higher temperature.

For most substances the gas–liquid–solid triple point is also the minimum temperature at which the liquid can exist. For water, however, this is not true because the melting point of ordinary ice decreases as a function of pressure, as shown by the dashed green line in the phase diagram. At temperatures just below the triple point, compression at constant temperature transforms water vapor first to solid and then to liquid (water ice has lower density than liquid water, so increasing pressure leads to a liquefaction).

The triple point pressure of water was used during the Mariner 9 mission to Mars as a reference point to define "sea level". More recent missions use laser altimetry and gravity measurements instead of pressure to define elevation on Mars.

High-pressure phases
At high pressures, water has a complex phase diagram with 15 known phases of ice and several triple points, including 10 whose coordinates are shown in the diagram. For example, the triple point at 251 K (−22 °C) and 210 MPa (2070 atm) corresponds to the conditions for the coexistence of ice Ih (ordinary ice), ice III and liquid water, all at equilibrium. There are also triple points for the coexistence of three solid phases, for example ice II, ice V and ice VI at 218 K (−55 °C) and 620 MPa (6120 atm).

For those high-pressure forms of ice which can exist in equilibrium with liquid, the diagram shows that melting points increase with pressure. At temperatures above 273 K (0 °C), increasing the pressure on water vapor results first in liquid water and then a high-pressure form of ice. In the range , ice I is formed first, followed by liquid water and then ice III or ice V, followed by other still denser high-pressure forms.

Triple-point cells
Triple-point cells are used in the calibration of thermometers.  For exacting work, triple-point cells are typically filled with a highly pure chemical substance such as hydrogen, argon, mercury, or water (depending on the desired temperature).  The purity of these substances can be such that only one part in a million is a contaminant, called "six nines" because it is 99.9999% pure.  A specific isotopic composition (for water, VSMOW) is used because variations in isotopic composition cause small changes in the triple point.  Triple-point cells are so effective at achieving highly precise, reproducible temperatures, that an international calibration standard for thermometers called ITS–90 relies upon triple-point cells of hydrogen, neon, oxygen, argon, mercury, and water for delineating six of its defined temperature points.

Table of triple points
This table lists the gas–liquid–solid triple points of several substances. Unless otherwise noted, the data come from the U.S. National Bureau of Standards (now NIST, National Institute of Standards and Technology).

 
Notes:
 For comparison, typical atmospheric pressure is 101.325 kPa (1 atm).
 Before the new definition of SI units, water's triple point, 273.16 K, was an exact number.

See also
Critical point (thermodynamics)
Gibbs' phase rule

References

External links

Chemical properties
Phase transitions
Thermodynamics
Threshold temperatures
Gases
1873 introductions